I Know...Brad (sometimes I Know How You Must Feel, Brad) is a 1964 pop art painting by Roy Lichtenstein that uses his classic Ben-Day dots and a speech balloon. The work is located at the Ludwig Forum für Internationale Kunst in Aachen. It is an example of how Lichtenstein used his artistry to make significant changes to the original comics sources.

Background
Lichtenstein stated that the name Brad sounded heroic to him and was used with the aim of clichéd oversimplification.

Background

Measuring 174 cm × 95.9 cm (68.5 in × 37.75 in), I Know...Brad is considered an ironic depiction of emotional expression. The work is a three-quarter-length, single image of a lovelorn girl. This is one of Lichtenstein's post-1963 comics-based women that "...look hard, crisp, brittle, and uniformly modish in appearance, as if they all came out of the same pot of makeup."

Details
According to a reproduction of Ellen H. Johnson's article entitled "Lichtenstein and the Printed Image" from Art and Artists (London, June 1966) the painting is somewhat removed from the original, while satirically mimicking several elements of it:

Johnson notes how Lichtenstein transforms the comic inspiration not only by enlarging the scale, but he also by eliminating non-essential details such as fingernails and traces of forearm musculature. In addition, by varying and reducing the number of lines he presents a better depiction of their character. His color change makes the work more dynamic and the subject more idealized. He also makes the landscape background more robust. Lichtenstein stated that the name Brad sounded heroic to him and was used with the aim of clichéd oversimplification. The work presents an "...unmistakeable acknowledgement to the flamboyant linearism of Art Nouveau...".

See also
 1964 in art

Notes

References

External links
Lichtenstein Foundation website
Roy Lichtenstein letter to Ellen H. Johnson with original source material for I Know...Brad at the Archives of American Art, Smithsonian Institution

1964 paintings
20th-century portraits
Paintings by Roy Lichtenstein
Portraits by American artists